Balqa' ( Al Balqā’) is one of the governorates of Jordan. It is located northwest of Amman, Jordan's capital.

The governorate has the fourth largest population of the 12 governorates of Jordan, and is ranked 10th by area. It has the third highest population density in the kingdom after Irbid Governorate and Jerash Governorate.

History
The "Balqa" historically referred to the entire area of the eastern plateau of the Jordan Valley as early as the 7th century when Heraclius' brother Theodore fought an early campaign against the Arabs on the approaches to southern Syria. During biblical times, the southern part of Balqa was known as the Plains of Moab.

During World War I, the British army led by General Edmund Allenby entered Salt on 24 March 1918, in the Battles for Amman campaign, marking the end of a 500-year Ottoman rule.
 
On March 21, 1968, the town of Karameh near Shouna al-Janubiyya was the site of Battle of Karameh, between Israel on one side, and Jordan and Palestinian forces (Fatah, PLO) on the other side. It was one of the largest military confrontations of the War of Attrition, in the period between the Six-Day War of 1967 and the Yom Kippur War of 1973.

Administrative divisions
The capital of the Balqa' Governorate is Salt. Other cities and towns in the governorate are Mahis, Fuhais and Ain Al-Basha.

Demographics 

The population of districts according to census results:

Economy
Due to its fertile mountains, the governorate's economy is based on agriculture, as well as industry, such as the cement factory in Fuheis, run by Jordan Cement Factories Ltd - Lafarge, and pharmaceutical companies including the Arab Pharmaceutical Manufacturing company.

There are two universities in the governorate: Balqa Applied University (BAU), located near the Salt ring road, and Al-Ahliyya Amman University (AAU) located on the main highway between Amman and Salt. It is also home to the SESAME facility, the first research facility of its type in the Middle East.

Gallery

References

 
Governorates of Jordan